Francois Croes (born 11 October 1990) is a football (soccer) player and member of the Aruba national football team. His playing position is centre back.

References

External links

1990 births
People from Oranjestad, Aruba
Living people
Aruban footballers
SV Estrella players

Association football central defenders
Aruba international footballers
Aruba youth international footballers